In the 2006 season, Shelbourne were crowned League of Ireland Premier Division champions.

Overview 
Despite having battled with dire finances for much of the 2006 season, mainly due to market risk-taking in the drive for success, over-expenditure on player-purchase fees, high wages, low home attendance rates and continuing tax debts, Shelbourne actually managed to win the title. However, they had been hit with three winding-up orders by the Revenue Commissioners within a spell of nine months but just about managed to gather enough funds and investment to keep the tax collectors off their backs and keep the club running on each occasion. This was at the expense of the players, though, who had gone for weeks without their wages and it seemed that the only thing keeping them performing at the club was the season's climax and the drive for the title, as well as promises (which ultimately turned out to be empty) of a remedy. Once the season came to a close the rot set in and the general public were made fully aware of the true extent of how poor a state the club were in. Due to the finances, many found it extraordinary that Shelbourne had been awarded a Premier Division licence for 2007 by the Independent Assessment Group a few months earlier. They saw it as another chance to criticise the lack of transparency within the organisation that appointed the Group who were supposed to dispense licences to clubs who were solvent and financially stable for the foreseeable future - the Football Association of Ireland. The association has been well used to criticism of its administration in the past, but clearly, the Group could not have been said to have performed their role effectively.

Manager Pat Fenlon tendered his resignation from Shelbourne on 5 December 2006. This was in spite of Shelbourne winning the title on goal difference from Derry City. Fenlon's departure precipitated a widescale exodus from Tolka Park, as players, unhappy with the wage situation, departed to rival clubs - many having their contracts rescinded by law.

Personnel

Managerial/backroom staff 

Manager: Pat Fenlon
Assistant Manager: Eamon Collins

2006 squad members 

 (Captain)

Out on loan

Transfers In 
The following players joined Shelbourne for the 2006 campaign:

Transfers Out

Results

League of Ireland Premier Division

Expunged League Results

Final League

League results summary

League Form/Results by Round

UEFA Intertoto Cup

First Round 

Shelbourne won 5 - 0 on aggregate

Second Round 

OB Odense won 3 - 1 on aggregate

FAI Carlsberg Cup

Second Round

Third Round

eircom League Cup

Second Round

Quarter-Finals

Semi-Finals

Final

Setanta Sports Cup

Group B

Final Group B Table

Semi-Finals

Friendlies

2006 season Statistics

Player appearances/goals 

As of 17 November 2006.

|}

Top goalscorers

References 

2006
Shelbourne
Shels